"Lucky Man" is a song by English rock band the Verve. It was written by singer Richard Ashcroft. The song was released as the third single from the band's third studio album, Urban Hymns (1997). It was released on 24 November 1997, charting at number seven on the UK Singles Chart. The song was also the band's second top 20 hit on the Billboard Modern Rock Tracks chart in the United States, climbing to number 16. In Canada, "Lucky Man" peaked at number 25 on the RPM Top Singles chart. It also reached the top 40 in Finland, Iceland, Ireland, and New Zealand.

Background
In an interview on BBC Radio 2, singer Richard Ashcroft said the song was "inspired by my relationship with my wife, and that sense of when you're beyond the sort of peacock dance that you have early on in a relationship. And you're getting down to the raw nature of yourselves."

Release
"Lucky Man" was released in the United Kingdom on 24 November 1997 across four formats: two CD singles, a 7-inch vinyl single, and a cassette single. An earlier single from the band, "History", is included as a B-side on CD1 of the UK release. The final B-side on CD2, "Happiness More or Less", is a remix of the title track made by guitarist Nick McCabe after another B-side was needed for the release. All of the guitar and most of the vocal parts were taken out, leaving the drums, bass and strings. Another B-side on CD2, "MSG", is an alternate version of "Bitter Sweet Symphony" that features the percussion and bass line from that song, with psychedelic soundscapes added. In the United States, "Lucky Man" was serviced to alternative radio on 7 April 1998.

Reception
U2's Bono listed the song as one of six songs released between 1986–2006 that he wished he'd written.

Music videos
The UK version of the video was directed by Andy Baybutt and sees the band in the Thames Reach development, adjacent to the Thames Wharf complex, directly opposite the Harrods Furniture Depository. This is situated near Hammersmith, west London in post code W6 9HA. Richard Ashcroft sings the song whilst playing an acoustic guitar; the rest of the band look on. The Thames Wharf Complex was designed by Sir Richard Rogers. The US version was shot in New York City, featuring the band in an apartment and then travelling to a mountain top.

Track listings

UK CD1 and cassette single 
 "Lucky Man"
 "Never Wanna See You Cry"
 "History"

UK CD2 and Australian CD single 
 "Lucky Man"
 "MSG"
 "The Longest Day"
 "Lucky Man (Happiness More or Less)"

UK 12-inch single 
A1. "Lucky Man"
A2. "Never Wanna See You Cry"
B1. "MSG"
B2. "Longest Day"

Australian and New Zealand VHS single 
 "Lucky Man"
 "Bitter Sweet Symphony"
 "Lucky Man" (UK version)

Charts and certifications

Weekly charts

Year-end charts

Certifications

References

External links
 
 

Songs about luck
1997 singles
1997 songs
Hut Records singles
Song recordings produced by Chris Potter (record producer)
Songs written by Richard Ashcroft
The Verve songs